Jill Craigie (born Noreen Jean Craigie; 7 March 1911 – 13 December 1999) was a British documentary filmmaker, screenwriter and feminist. She was one of Britain's earliest female documentary makers. Her early films demonstrate Craigie's interest in socialist and feminist politics, but her career as a film-maker has been "somewhat eclipsed" by her marriage to the Labour Party leader Michael Foot (1913–2010), whom she met during the making of her film The Way We Live (1946).

Early life 
Born Noreen Jean Craigie to a Russian mother and a Scottish father in Fulham, London, Craigie began her career in film as an actress.

Career
Craigie's engagement in feminist issues came from reading Sylvia Pankhurst's The Suffragette Movement in the early 1940s. After this she attended a gathering of former suffragettes to lay flowers on the statue of Emmeline Pankhurst. She was struck by suffragettes' story and began interviewing them and starting to lay the groundwork for a documentary of the movement. This never materialized due to the complicated internal politics of the suffrage movement post-campaign. Much of this correspondence can be found in her archives. In latter years, Craigie became an authority on the suffragette movement, holding a large collection of feminist literature in Britain, with pamphlets dating back to John Stuart Mill. In 1979, she wrote an introduction to a reprint of Emmeline Pankhurst's My Own Story, first published 1914.

Her subsequent films depicted her socialist and feminist leanings and dealt with left-wing topics such as child refugees, working conditions for miners, and gender equality. After directing five films and writing two others, Craigie retired from the film business for almost forty years, returning to make a single film for BBC television.

Craigie was one of the scriptwriters of Trouble in Store, Norman Wisdom's film debut, which screened in December 1953. The film broke box-office records at 51 out of the 67 London cinemas in which it played. After writing the first draft of the script, Craigie reportedly asked that her name be removed from the credits after learning of Wisdom's participation.

Personal life
Craigie had a daughter, Julie, from her first marriage. She and Michael Foot had no children together, but enjoyed family life with Julie and, later, her four children. They lived in a flat in Hampstead, north London, and in a cottage in Ebbw Vale, Wales. While living in Hampstead, Craigie worked as an Air Raid Precaution Warden during World War II.

In 1998, a biography of the late Hungarian-born writer Arthur Koestler by David Cesarani alleged that Koestler had been a serial rapist and that Craigie had been one of his victims in 1951. Craigie confirmed the allegations. In a 2009 biography, Koestler: The Indispensable Intellectual, Michael Scammell countered that Craigie was the only woman to go on record that she had been raped by Koestler, and had done so at a dinner party more than fifty years after the event. Claims that Koestler had been violent were added by Craigie later, although Scammell concedes that Koestler could be rough and sexually aggressive.

Craigie died aged 88 in 1999 of heart failure at the Royal Free Hospital in Hampstead, London.

Critical reception and legacy
Craigie's films were recognised for their "ability to bring out the best in 'ordinary people'" and the "political commitment". Philip Kemp commented more directly on the political content of Craigie's films, noting that her films were an "example of filmmaking as activism, the creative and political processes intertwining and advancing each other that even the Soviet filmmakers of the 1920s had only rarely achieved."

In 2022 a documentary about her life was released. Independent Miss Craigie was directed by Lizzie Thynne, and is one element in a larger resech project designed to bring Craigie to wider scholarly and public attention. "Jill Craigie: Film Pioneer" is based at the University of Sussex and funded by the  Arts and Humanities Research Council.

Archives
The archives of Jill Craigie are held at The Women's Library at the Library of the London School of Economics, ref 7JCC

Filmography
Make-Up (1937), actress
Looking Through Glass (1943), script
The Flemish Farm (1943), screenwriter (credited as "Jill Dell")
Out of Chaos (1944), writer and director
London Terminus (1944), script
The Way We Live (1946), writer and director
Children of the Ruins (1948), director
Blue Scar (1949), writer and director
To Be a Woman (1951), writer, director and producer
The Million Pound Note (1953), screenwriter
Trouble in Store (1953), uncredited screenwriter
Windom's Way (1957), screenwriter
Who Are the Vandals? (1967), director
Two Hours from London (1995)

Bibliography

Craigie, Jill (1955). "I Call This a National Calamity". Tribune. 28 October 1955.
Craigie, Jill (1962). "Pilkington: A Second Chance for Television". Tribune. 6 July 1962.

Further reading

Jill Craigie's Suffragette suitcase

See also
Feminist film theory
 Socialist realism

References

External links

1911 births
1999 deaths
20th-century British women writers
British documentary filmmakers
English activists
English women activists
English feminists
English film directors
English film producers
English people of Russian descent
English people of Scottish descent
English socialists
People from Camden Town
People from Fulham
People from Hampstead
English socialist feminists
British women screenwriters
20th-century English screenwriters
20th-century English businesspeople
Spouses of British politicians